Paul-Henri Mathieu was the defending champion but lost in the semifinals to Taylor Dent.

Dent won in the final 7–6(7–5), 6–4 against Sargis Sargsian.

Seeds

Draw

Finals

Top half

Bottom half

Qualifying

Seeds

Qualifiers

Qualifying draw

First qualifier

Second qualifier

Third qualifier

Fourth qualifier

External links
 Draw
 Qualifying Draw (ATP)
 ITF tournament profile

Kremlin Cup
Kremlin Cup